Ice II is a rhombohedral crystalline form of ice with a highly ordered structure. It is formed from ice Ih by compressing it at a temperature of 198 K at 300 MPa or by decompressing ice V. When heated it undergoes transformation to ice III. Ordinary water ice is known as ice Ih,  (in the Bridgman nomenclature).  Different types of ice, from ice II to ice XIX, have been created in the laboratory at different temperatures and pressures. It is thought that the cores of icy moons like Jupiter's Ganymede may be made of ice II.

History
The properties of ice II were first described and recorded by Gustav Heinrich Johann Apollon Tammann in 1900 during his experiments with ice under high pressure and low temperatures. Having produced ice III, Tammann then tried condensing the ice at a temperature between  under  of pressure. Tammann noted that in this state ice II was denser than he had observed ice III to be. He also found that both types of ice can be kept at normal atmospheric pressure in a stable condition so long as the temperature is kept at that of liquid air, which slows the change in conformation back to ice Ih.

This difference hadn't been discovered by Tammann due to the small change and was why he had been unable to determine an equilibrium curve between the two. The curve showed that the structural change from ice III to ice II was more likely to happen if the medium had previously been in the structural conformation of ice II. However, if a sample of ice III that had never been in the ice II state was obtained, it could be supercooled even below −70 °C without it changing into ice II. Conversely, however, any superheating of ice II was not possible in regards to retaining the same form. Bridgman found that the equilibrium curve between ice II and ice IV was much the same as with ice III, having the same stability properties and small volume change. The curve between ice II and ice V was extremely different, however, with the curve's bubble being essentially a straight line and the volume difference being almost always .

Quest for a hydrogen-disordered counterpart of ice II 

As ice II is completely hydrogen ordered, the presence of its disordered counterpart is a great matter of interest. Shephard et al.  investigated the phase boundaries of NH4F-doped ices because NH4F has been reported to be a hydrogen disordering reagent. However, adding 2.5 mol% of NH4F resulted in the disappearance of ice II instead of the formation of a disordered ice II. According to the DFC calculation by Nakamura et al. , the phase boundary between ice II and its disordered counterpart is estimated to be in the stability region of liquid water.

See also 
 Ice, for other crystalline forms of ice

References

Water ice